Jan Walenty Tomaka (born 15 January 1949 in Nowa Wieś) is a Polish politician. He was elected to the Sejm on 25 September 2005 getting 7915 votes in 23 Rzeszów district as a candidate from the Civic Platform list.

He was also a member of Sejm 2001-2005.

He graduated from the university of Krakow in 1971 with a MSc in geology.

See also
Members of Polish Sejm 2005-2007

External links
Jan Walenty Tomaka - parliamentary page - includes declarations of interest, voting record, and transcripts of speeches.

Members of the Polish Sejm 2005–2007
Members of the Polish Sejm 2001–2005
Civic Platform politicians
1949 births
Living people